Transilien Paris-Nord is one of the sectors in the Paris Transilien suburban rail network. The trains on this sector depart from Gare du Nord in central Paris, and serve the north-west and north-east of Île-de-France region with Transilien lines H and K. Transilien services from Gare du Nord are part of the SNCF Gare du Nord rail network.

Line H

The trains on Line H travel between Gare du Nord in Paris and the north-west of Île-de-France region, with termini in Luzarches, Pontoise, Persan–Beaumont and Creil.

List of Line H stations

Pontoise branch
 Gare du Nord
 Saint-Denis station
 Épinay–Villetaneuse station
 La Barre - Ormesson station
 Enghien-les-Bains station
 Champ de courses d'Enghien station
 Ermont–Eaubonne station
 Cernay station
 Franconville – Le Plessis-Bouchard station
 Montigny–Beauchamp station
 Pierrelaye station
 Saint-Ouen-l'Aumône-Liesse station
 Saint-Ouen-l'Aumône station
 Pontoise station

Persan-Beaumont West Branch
 Ermont-Halte station
 Gros Noyer–Saint-Prix station
 Saint-Leu-la-Forêt station
 Vaucelles station
 Taverny station
 Bessancourt station
 Frépillon station
 Méry-sur-Oise station
 Mériel station
 Valmondois station
 L'Isle-Adam–Parmain station
 Champagne-sur-Oise station
 Persan–Beaumont station

Persan-Beaumont East Branch 
 Deuil - Montmagny station
 Groslay station
 Sarcelles–Saint-Brice station
 Écouen - Ézanville station
 Domont station
 Bouffémont - Moisselles station
 Montsoult–Maffliers station
 Presles–Courcelles station
 Nointel - Mours station
 Persan–Beaumont station

Luzarches branch
 Villaines station
 Belloy–Saint-Martin station
 Viarmes station
 Seugy station
 Luzarches station

Pontoise-Creil branch
 Pontoise station
 Saint-Ouen-l'Aumône station
 Épluches station
 Pont-Petit station
 Chaponval station
 Auvers-sur-Oise station
 same route as the Persan-Beaumont west line between Valmondois and Persan-Beaumont
 Bruyères-sur-Oise station
 Boran-sur-Oise station
 Précy-sur-Oise station
 Saint-Leu-d'Esserent station
 Creil station

Services
Like other Transilien lines, every train service consists of four letters and is called a name of mission, mission code or a name of service. These have been adopted during the Transilien service update of 2004. They are only displayed on timetables and on passenger information display systems.

The first letter corresponds to the destination of the train.
 A: Gare du Nord
 D: Saint-Denis
 E: Ermont-Eaubonne
 F: Saint-Leu-la-Forêt
 L: Luzarches
 M: Montsoult–Maffliers
 O: Pontoise
 P: Persan–Beaumont
 S: Sarcelles–Saint-Brice
 T: Transversal (Creil, Pontoise or Persan–Beaumont) or Ermont-Eaubonne for work missions
 V: Valmondois

The second, third and fourth letters indicate the stations served by the train. A Transilien Line H train calling all stations has an O as the second or the third letter (AOLA, OPOC, POVA, SOGA). An E on the second position indicates that a radial service does not serve nearly all stations on the route (LEMI, LEVI). If the train runs via Montsoult–Maffliers then the third letter is always an M (LOMI, POMA).

Some of the service names may spell backwards when going in "down" direction, which is from Gare du Nord. This usually occurs when the fourth letter is the train's station of origin. Examples: ADDO (to Gare du Nord) spelled backwards is ODDA (to Pontoise), AREV (to Gare du Nord) spelled backwards is VERA (to Valmondois).

Line K

The trains on Line K serves primarily the north-est of Île-de-France region and travel between Gare du Nord in Paris and Crépy-en-Valois in Hauts-de-France region.

List of Line K stations
 Gare du Nord
 Aulnay-sous-Bois station
 Mitry–Claye station
 Compans station
 Thieux - Nantouillet station
 Dammartin - Juilly - Saint-Mard station
 Le Plessis-Belleville station
 Nanteuil-le-Haudouin station
 Ormoy-Villers station
 Crépy-en-Valois station

Services 
The four-letter codes of Line K are much simpler. Only one of the four letters have a meaning: this indicates the destination, which is the start of the code. If a four-letter code begins with a K, this means that the train runs to Crépy-en-Valois, but if a four-letter code begins with an A, this means that the train runs to Gare du Nord. Line K assigns names of services to TER services as well for Paris-Laon services (TERL to Laon and TERP to Gare du Nord).

See also
 List of Transilien stations

References

Transilien